The Paniai Lakes, originally known as the Wissel Lakes, are the three large, freshwater lakes in Central Papua, Indonesia: Paniai, Tigi, and Tage. Lakes Paniai and Tage are located in the Paniai Regency, while Lake Tigi is located in Deiyai Regency. The largest of the three is Lake Paniai (Danau Paniai), while its immediate neighbor Lake Tage is the smallest.

Discovery
Despite their considerable size (Lake Paniai alone is larger than Lake Como), they were not known outside New Guinea until 1937. On 31 December 1936, the Dutch navy pilot Frits Julius Wissel, just weeks after first-ascending the highest mountain of New Guinea, and his crew flew over the lakes while making an aerial survey for the Dutch New Guinea oil company. He took photos and noticed many people in canoes, establishing that this mountainous region was populated. During a follow-up flight by E.L.J. Haak on 15 February 1937, it was established that there were many settlements around the lakes, indicating a thriving agricultural society. In November of that year, the Dutch Indies government named the group of lakes after Wissel. A small Dutch outpost was established here in 1938, but contact was cut off during the Second World War.

Recent history
The region of the Paniai Lakes, consisting of a depression between the Weyland and Sudirman ranges, is heavily populated. The indigenous peoples of this area are the Ekagi, also called the Mee. Around the year 2001, as part of the Papua conflict, the surrounding forests were burned down by the military so that they could not harbor separatists. Illegal or informal mining operations in Baya Biru also exacerbated the pollution and environmental degradation. However, it was difficult for local authorities to stop because of its remote location, which is only accessible by helicopter, and mining activities provide employment for 7,000 people in the area. Combined, these resulted in increased sedimentation of Lake Paniai, and in 2011, the lake overflowed, flooding the surrounding area with up to 4 meters of water.

Ecology
There are few fish in the lakes, but the Paniai gudgeon (Oxyeleotris wisselensis) is endemic to the lake system. The common carp (Cyprinus carpio), Nile tilapia (Oreochromis niloticus) and Mozambique tilapia (O. mossambicus) are non-natives that have been introduced by humans.

In contrast to the low fish diversity, there is a very high diversity of Parastacid crayfish of the genus Cherax. Of the eight species known from the lake system, two (C. longipes and C. solus) are endemic Lake Tigi, five (C. boschmai, C. buitendijkae, C. murido, C. pallidus and C. paniaicus) are endemic to Lake Paniai, and a single species (C. communis) is found both in the lakes and the surrounding area.

A species of skink (Emoia paniai), is endemic to and named after the area.

See also
 Paniai Lakes languages

References

External links
First photo of Lake Paniai and Lake Tage by Frits Wissel on December 31, 1936.

Lakes of Western New Guinea
Landforms of Papua (province)